Saint Gaud (died 491) was Bishop of Evreux from 440 to 480.  His feast is 31 January.

Biography 
Saint Gaud was born to a wealthy family of Evreux around the year 400. Touched by the profanations perpetrated by the inhabitants after the death of Saint Taurin, he undertook to restore the Christian religion in his region. He immediately preached the gospel and built churches.

He was Bishop of Evreux for 40 years before retiring in 480 to finish his life in the forest of Scissy, where he died around the year 491.

According to legend, the miracles that occurred near his relics were innumerable; the people paid tribute to him by the following adage: "Blessed Saint Gaud heals all evils". He is reputed to heal especially nervous diseases of small children and depression.

He is revered at Saint-Pair-sur-Mer, where an altar is dedicated to him. Parents used to come there to bless their children's swaddles and thus preserve them from disease. Pilgrims today address their requests on a register or on the mass ticket. A church is also dedicated to him in Normanville, Normandy.

References

Source 

Hippolyte Gancel, Les saints qui guérissent en Normandie, 2006

Medieval Breton saints
491 deaths
5th-century Christian saints